Sun Feixiang (born 15 May 1998) is a Chinese badminton player from Yichang. He was the gold medalists at the 2016 Asian and World Junior Championships in the boys' singles event. He won his first senior international title at the 2017 China International tournament in the men's singles event, and claimed his first BWF Tour title in the 2019 Indonesia Masters Super 100 tournament, beating Thailand's Tanongsak Saensomboonsuk in straight games in the final.

Achievements

BWF World Junior Championships 
Boys' singles

Asian Junior Championships 
Boys' singles

BWF World Tour (2 titles, 3 runners-up) 
The BWF World Tour, announced on 19 March 2017 and implemented in 2018, is a series of elite badminton tournaments, sanctioned by Badminton World Federation (BWF). The BWF World Tour is divided into six levels, namely World Tour Finals, Super 1000, Super 750, Super 500, Super 300, and the BWF Tour Super 100.

Men's singles

BWF International Challenge/Series (1 title) 
Men's singles

  BWF International Challenge tournament
  BWF International Series tournament

References

External links 
 

Living people
1998 births
People from Yichang
Badminton players from Hubei
Chinese male badminton players